S. uliginosa may refer to:
 Salvia uliginosa, the bog sage, a herbaceous perennial plant species native to southern Brazil, Uruguay and Argentina
 Shorea uliginosa, a plant species found in Indonesia and Malaysia

See also
 Uliginosa